Lieutenant General Paul William Jaques,  is a senior British Army officer, who served as Chief of Materiel (Land) and Quartermaster-General to the Forces.

Military career
Jaques was commissioned into the Royal Electrical and Mechanical Engineers (REME) on 6 August 1983. He became commander of the 101st Logistic Brigade in December 2005, and saw action in that role in the Iraq War. He went on to be Head of Capability and Expeditionary Logistics in April 2008, Head of Equipment Planning to the Deputy Chief of the Defence Staff (Capability) in July 2011, and Director Land Equipment at Defence Equipment and Support in December 2013. He was appointed a Commander of the Order of the British Empire in the 2013 Birthday Honours.

Jaques was promoted to lieutenant general on 8 March 2016, and made Chief of Materiel (Land) and Quartermaster-General to the Forces that same year. He was appointed Companion of the Order of the Bath (CB) in the 2019 Birthday Honours. Jaques retired from the Regular Army on 7 December 2019.

Jaques has been Master General REME since April 2017.

References

 

British Army lieutenant generals
British Army personnel of the Gulf War
British Army personnel of the Iraq War
Companions of the Order of the Bath
Commanders of the Order of the British Empire
Living people
Royal Electrical and Mechanical Engineers officers
Year of birth missing (living people)